Tomasz Blatiewicz is a Paralympian athlete from Poland competing mainly in category F37 throws events.

Tomasz won two golds in the 2004 Summer Paralympics in Athens, Greece in the F37 discus and the F37 shot put.  On returning four years later in 2008 in Beijing he could not manage to defend his titles only manage a silver in the F37/38 shot put and was outside the medals in the F37/38 discus

External links
 

Paralympic athletes of Poland
Athletes (track and field) at the 2004 Summer Paralympics
Athletes (track and field) at the 2008 Summer Paralympics
Paralympic gold medalists for Poland
Paralympic silver medalists for Poland
Living people
Place of birth missing (living people)
Medalists at the 2004 Summer Paralympics
Medalists at the 2008 Summer Paralympics
Medalists at the 2012 Summer Paralympics
Athletes (track and field) at the 2012 Summer Paralympics
Year of birth missing (living people)
Paralympic medalists in athletics (track and field)
20th-century Polish people
21st-century Polish people